Kentucky Route 319 (KY 319) is a  state highway in the U.S. state of Kentucky. The highway travels through mostly rural areas of Pike County.

Route description
KY 319 begins at an intersection with KY 1056 north-northeast of Ransom, within Pike County. It travels to the northwest, paralleling Hatfield Branch, and passes the Anderson Hatfield Cemetery before it curves to the west-southwest. It then curves to the northwest. The highway begins paralleling Blackberry Fork and passes Julius Scott Cemetery. It passes Blackberry Fork Park and crosses over the fork twice before traveling through Hardy. It curves to the north-northeast and enters Toler. It curves to the north-northwest and crosses over Churchouse Hollow and Pond Creek. The highway curves to the west-southwest and meets its northern terminus, an intersection with U.S. Route 119 (US 119). Here, the roadway continues as a local road.

Major intersections

See also

References

0319
Transportation in Pike County, Kentucky